Amrita Sawaram (born 13 August 1980) is a Mauritian badminton player. She won the gold medal at the 2000 African Championships in the women's singles event, made her as the first Mauritian female to win that competition. Sawaram competed at the 2000 Summer Olympics in Sydney, Australia in the women's singles and doubles event. Sawaram also represented her country in three consecutive Commonwealth Games in 1998, 2002, and 2006.

Achievements

African Championships 
Women's singles

Women's doubles

Mixed doubles

BWF International Challenge/Series
Women's singles

Women's doubles

Mixed doubles

References

External links
 
 
 

1980 births
Living people
People from Moka District
Mauritian people of Indian descent
Mauritian female badminton players
Olympic badminton players of Mauritius
Badminton players at the 2000 Summer Olympics
Commonwealth Games competitors for Mauritius
Badminton players at the 1998 Commonwealth Games
Badminton players at the 2002 Commonwealth Games
Badminton players at the 2006 Commonwealth Games
African Games bronze medalists for Mauritius
African Games medalists in badminton
Competitors at the 2003 All-Africa Games